The Intellectual Property Office (TIPO) is the patent, trademark, and copyright office of Taiwan (Republic of China). It operates under the jurisdiction of the Ministry of Economic Affairs (MOEA). As of July 2011, TIPO had a staff of 734 persons, with more than half of them handling patent matters.

History
TIPO was established in 1927. The Republic of China's government is not a member of WIPO, but through the cooperation partnership signed with the French National Institute of Industrial Property (INPI) in 2004, the two national intellectual property offices are able to exchange and learn the updated information and best practices from EU, WIPO, the Madrid Agreement, European Patent Office and APEC.

Transportation
The office is accessible within walking distance south of Technology Building Station of Taipei Metro.

See also
 Patent office

References

External links
 
 Information about patent law in Chinese Taipei (TW) on the European Patent Office website

Organizations established in 1999
1999 establishments in Taiwan
Patent offices
Intellectual Property Office